The City of Mandurah is a local government area of Western Australia, covering both Mandurah proper and an additional area reaching down as far south as Lake Clifton.

It is bordered by the City of Rockingham to the north, the Shire of Murray to the east (the border being for the most part the Harvey Estuary and Serpentine River), and Shire of Waroona to the south.

History
The area that is now Mandurah was part of the Murray Road District until 1949.

The City of Mandurah originated as the Mandurah Road District, established on 10 June 1949. The road board held its first meeting on 1 September 1949. The board was suspended on 12 July 1956 by an Order in Council and the district was placed under the administration of Commissioner Richard Rushton, who ultimately served in the role for almost four years.

It became the Shire of Mandurah on 1 July 1961 following the passage of the Local Government Act 1960, which reformed all remaining road districts into shires. It became the Town of Mandurah when it gained town status on 1 July 1987 and assumed its current name when it gained city status on 14 April 1990.

Wards
The City is divided into four wards, each electing three councillors:

East Ward
North Ward
Coastal Ward
Town Ward

Suburbs and localities
The suburbs and localities of the City of Mandurah with population and size figures based on the most recent Australian census:

Officials
The elected members on the Mandurah City Council are:

Mayor
Rhys Williams 
East Ward
Darren Lee
Lynn Rodgers
Don Pember
Coastal Ward
Merv Darcy
Jenny Green
Candice Di Prinzio
North Ward
Caroline Knight, Deputy Mayor
Peter Jackson
Ahmed Zilani
Town Ward
Peter Rogers
Dave Schumacher
Matt Rogers

Population

Heritage-listed places

As of 2023, 86 places are heritage-listed in the City of Mandurah, of which five are on the State Register of Heritage Places.

References

External links
 

Mandurah
Mandurah